Prince Wilhelm Victor of Prussia (15 February 1919 – 7 February 1989) was a German nobleman, soldier and diplomat.

Life 
Prince Wilhelm Victor was a grandson of Emperor Wilhelm II and the youngest child of Prince Adalbert of Prussia (14 July 1884 – 22 September 1948) and Princess Adelheid "Adi" of Saxe-Meiningen (16 August 1891 – 25 April 1971). His father, Prince Adalbert carried also the title "Graf Lingen". He forfeited his rights of succession as a result of his unequal marriage.

His sister, Princess Viktoria Marina married William Patterson.

Marriage 
Prince Wilhelm Victor married at Donaueschingen 20 July 1944 Marie Antoinette, Countess of Hoyos (Hohenthurm, 27 June 1920 – Marbella 1 March 2004), and had the following issue:

Princess Marie Louise Marina Franziska of Prussia (18 September 1945) she married Count Rudolf (Rudi) of Schönburg-Glauchau on 19 May 1971. They have two children:
Countess Sophie Anastasia Wilhelmine Marie Antoinette of Schönburg-Glauchau (17 May 1979) she married Carles Andreu Alacreu on 21 September 2013. They have two children:
Rudi Federico Nicolas Alacreu y Schönburg-Glauchau (12 September 2017)
Carlota Alacreu y Schönburg-Glauchau (6 May 2019)
Count Friedrich Wilhelm Simeon Dionysius Joachim Rudolf Maria Adelbert of Schönburg-Glauchau (27 April 1985)
Prince Adalbert Alexander Friedrich Joachim Christian (born Konstanz 4 March 1948), who married at Glentorf 14 June 1981 Eva Maria Kudicke (born Shahi, Iran 30 June 1951); had issue:
Prince Alexander Friedrich Wilhelm-Viktor Marcus of Prussia (3 October 1984), he married Jenny von Rumohr (15 December 1985) on 14 February 2020.
Prince Christian Friedrich Wilhelm Johannes of Prussia (3 July 1986)
Prince Philipp Heinrich Adalbert Günther of Prussia (3 July 1986)

The Princess was born Countess Marie Antoinette, at Hohenthurm, 27 June 1920, daughter of Friedrich, Count Hoyos-Sprinzenstein, Baron zu Stichsenstein and Wilhelmine von Wuthenau of the Counts Hohenthurm.

Prince Wilhelm Viktor died on 7 February 1989 at age 69.

Ancestry

References

External links
www.preussen.de
Prince Wilhelm Viktor photo

Bibliography 
 Marlene A. Eilers, Queen Victoria's Descendants (Baltimore, Maryland: Genealogical Publishing Co., 1987), page 155. Hereinafter cited as Queen Victoria's Descendants.
 C. Arnold McNaughton, The Book of Kings: A Royal Genealogy, in 3 volumes (London, U.K.: Garnstone Press, 1973), volume 1, page 59. Hereinafter cited as The Book of King.
 Karin Feuerstein-Praßer: Die Deutschen Kaiserinnen 1871-1918, Piper Verlag 2002.
 John C. G. Röhl: The Kaiser and his court. Wilhelm II and the government of Germany. Cambridge University Press, Cambridge 1994.
 John C. G. Röhl: Wilhelm II., C. H. Beck, München 1993–2008.

1919 births
1989 deaths
Nobility from Kiel
People from the Province of Schleswig-Holstein
Prussian princes
House of Hohenzollern